Nick Klessing is a German artistic gymnast. He competed at both the 2018 World Artistic Gymnastics Championships in Doha, Qatar and 2019 World Artistic Gymnastics Championships in Stuttgart, Germany. In 2019, he finished in 8th place in the rings.

In 2016, he won the gold medal in the junior rings event at the 2016 European Men's Artistic Gymnastics Championships held in Bern, Switzerland.

References

External links 

 

Living people
Year of birth missing (living people)
Place of birth missing (living people)
German male artistic gymnasts
European champions in gymnastics
21st-century German people